Pointer Telocation was a publicly traded company, headquartered in Israel, that developed automatic vehicle location solutions and provided roadside automotive service. Its shares were traded on the NASDAQ Capital Market and were listed on the Tel Aviv Stock Exchange until 2012, and then again starting April 2016. In October 2019, the company merged with I.D. Systems, Inc., to form PowerFleet.

Operations 
Pointer Telocation operates in two areas of the motor vehicle services industry. The company provides RF- and GPS/GPRS-based automatic vehicle location solutions and command-and-control systems for fleet management and stolen vehicle recovery; and in addition, through its Shagrir subsidiary, it provides roadside assistance to motorists.

Corporate history 
Pointer was originally the name of a product developed by Nexus Telecommunications Systems Ltd. and marketed by Eden Telecom Ltd., beginning in 1999 with Eden's founding. The product's name was inspired by the Pointer dog breed. At the time of its establishment Eden was a joint venture of four Israeli investors: Motorola, Nexus, Poalim Investments, and Clal. In 1997 Nexus Telecommunications Systems changed its name to Nexus Telocation Systems Ltd. In 2002 Eden changed its name to Pointer. In 2004 Nexus Telocation Systems acquired Pointer and in 2006 changed its name to Pointer Telocation Ltd.
In May, 2006, Pointer Telocation signed an agreement with Latin American customer netting approximately $1.4 million, which was recorded as a one time income in Q2 2006 financial results. In addition, a new service level agreement was being negotiated with the customer to govern future activities.

Shaul Elovitch's Eurocom Group began accumulating shares of Pointer in August 2008, acquiring 9.03% of the company. Since December 2008 Eurocom holds 14.66% of Pointer's shares. DBSI Investments controls 37.27% of the company.

Management 
Giora Inbar, formerly commander of the Lebanon Liaison Unit of the Israel Defense Forces, was brought on board Eden Telecom as CEO with the company's founding in 1999. He left the position as part of the 2004–2005 deal to merge Shagrir with Pointer. In 2005 Danny Stern was appointed CEO and president of Pointer. He vacated the positions in 2011, whereupon David Mahlab became Pointer's CEO and president.

Acquisitions

See also 
 AAA
 Ituran
 Vehicle tracking system
 List of Israeli companies quoted on the Nasdaq

References 

Companies listed on the Tel Aviv Stock Exchange
Companies formerly listed on the Nasdaq
Technology companies established in 1991
Tracking
Wireless locating
Radio-frequency identification
Israeli companies established in 1991